The 2019 Orange Bowl was a college football bowl game played on December 30, 2019, with kickoff at 8:10 p.m. EST on ESPN. It was the 86th edition of the Orange Bowl, and one of the 2019–20 bowl games concluding the 2019 FBS football season. Sponsored by the Capital One Financial Corporation, the game was officially known as the Capital One Orange Bowl.

Teams
The game matched the Florida Gators of the Southeastern Conference (SEC) and the Virginia Cavaliers of the Atlantic Coast Conference (ACC). This was the second meeting of these programs, with the Gators having won the first meeting, 55–10, in 1959.

Florida Gators

Florida entered the Orange Bowl with an overall 10–2 record (6–2 in conference). They finished their regular season second in the East Division of the SEC, behind Georgia. Entering the game, the Gators were 1–2 against ranked FBS opponents, defeating Auburn while losing to LSU and Georgia.

Virginia Cavaliers

Virginia entered the Orange bowl with an overall 9–4 record (6–2 in conference), having lost the ACC Championship Game to Clemson after finishing atop the ACC's Coastal Division. The Cavaliers were also 1–2 against ranked FBS opponents, defeating Virginia Tech while losing to Notre Dame and Clemson. Unranked in the AP Poll at the time they received their bowl invitation, they become the first AP-unranked participant in the Orange Bowl since Florida in the 1967 edition.

Game summary

Statistics

References

External links

Game statistics at statbroadcast.com

Orange Bowl
Orange Bowl
Orange Bowl
Orange Bowl
Florida Gators football bowl games
Virginia Cavaliers football bowl games